The 1997–98 NBA season was the 52nd season for the Boston Celtics in the National Basketball Association. In the 1997 NBA draft, the Celtics selected Chauncey Billups from the University of Colorado with the third overall pick, and selected Ron Mercer from the University of Kentucky with the sixth pick. Despite finishing with the NBA's second worst record in 1996–97, the Celtics were back in the headlines after hiring University of Kentucky head coach Rick Pitino as their new coach. In the off-season, the team signed free agent Chris Mills, but then sent him to the New York Knicks in exchange for second-year forward Walter McCarty in October, and also signed second-year center Travis Knight, Andrew DeClercq, Bruce Bowen and Tyus Edney.

Pitino's Celtics career had an auspicious beginning on opening night when the Celtics upset Michael Jordan, and the 5-time defending NBA Champion Chicago Bulls, 92–85 at the FleetCenter on October 31, 1997. After a 1–5 start to the season, the Celtics held a 16–14 record as of January 3, but then lost eight of their next nine games. At midseason, the team traded Billups along with Dee Brown to the Toronto Raptors in exchange for Kenny Anderson and Popeye Jones; the Raptors had acquired Anderson from the Portland Trail Blazers. The Celtics held a 22–25 record at the All-Star break, and continued to struggle as they later on posted a six-game losing streak in March. Although the team did not make the playoffs, they improved their win total by 21 games from the previous season, finishing sixth in the Atlantic Division with a 36–46 record.

Second-year star Antoine Walker averaged 22.4 points, 10.2 rebounds and 1.7 steals per game, and was selected for the 1998 NBA All-Star Game, while Mercer averaged 15.3 points and 1.6 steals per game, and was named to the NBA All-Rookie First Team. In addition, McCarty provided the team with 9.6 points and 1.3 steals per game, and Dana Barros contributed 9.8 points and 3.6 assists per game off the bench. On the defensive side, Knight averaged 6.5 points and 4.8 rebounds per game, and DeClercq provided with 5.4 points and 4.8 rebounds per game. 

Following the season, Knight was traded back to his former team, the Los Angeles Lakers, after only playing just one season with the Celtics, and Edney left to play overseas.

Draft picks

Roster

Roster Notes
 Power forward Popeye Jones was acquired from the Toronto Raptors at midseason, but did not play for the Celtics this season due to a knee injury.

Regular season

Season standings

Record vs. opponents

Game log

Player statistics

Awards and records
 Ron Mercer, NBA All-Rookie Team 1st Team

Transactions

References

See also
 1997–98 NBA season

Boston Celtics seasons
Boston Celtics
Boston Celtics
Boston Celtics
Celtics
Celtics